Daniel Frederiksen is an Australian actor who has worked in television, film and live theatre.

Early life and education
Frederiksen grew up in Metcalfe, Victoria. He moved to Sydney to study at the National Institute of Dramatic Art.

Career

Film and Television 

Frederiksen played minor parts in the television shows Young Lions (2000), Mermaids (2001) and Blue Heelers (2002). He secured his first major television role as part of the cast of Australian series Stingers in its seventh season, playing Leo Flynn.  He received a Logie Award nomination in the category of Most Popular New Male Talent for his work on Stingers in 2004. He later played the lead in the ABC telemovie Bastard Boys in 2007, and received an AFI Award nomination as Best Lead Actor for his portrayal of Australian politician Greg Combet.  He appeared in a 2013 episode (S2:E1) of Miss Fisher's Murder Mysteries, “Murder Most Scandalous”.  In 2019, Frederiksen was cast in Upright, an Australian TV series created by Chris Taylor.

Frederiksen portrayed Wallow in the 2007 Sony Pictures film Ghost Rider. He starred in the Australian feature film Ten Empty (2009). Other film credits include feature films Summer Coda (2009) and Closed for Winter (2007) and an appearance in Underground.  Frederikson also played a trangendered mother in Pawno, which premiered at the Melbourne International Film Festival.

Theatre 

In addition to his screen credits Frederiksen has performed extensively in Australian live theatre.  For the Melbourne Theatre Company he has performed in Measure for Measure in 2000, Don Juan in Soho and Cheech in 2007, Dead Mans Cell Phone and Rockabye in 2009. 
Frederiksen portrayed Mark Antony in Bell Shakespeare's production of Julius Caesar (2011), touring around Australia and closing at the Sydney Opera House.

He was part of the original ensemble of Melbourne-based theatre company Red Stitch Actors Theatre, helping to establish the company. For Red Stitch he has appeared in many productions. Just some of these include playing the title role in Brendan Cowell's Ruben Guthrie (2011), Fatboy (2010), Leaves of Glass (2009), The Pain and The Itch (2008) and After Miss Julie (2007). In 2008 Daniel received a Melbourne Green Room nomination as Best Male actor for his performance in an independent production.   In 2009 he directed On Ego at Red Stitch.

In 2013 he performed the role of Giles in Travis Cotton's play Robots vs Art and Neil Labute's Fat Pig. In 2016 he is part of the Australian cast of Matilda the Musical, playing Matilda's nasty father.

Filmography
Ghost Rider (2007) - Wallow
Ten Empty (2008) - Elliot
Closed for Winter (2009) - Martin
Summer Coda (2010) - Miklos
Underground: The Julian Assange Story (2012) - Wayne
Vessel (2013) - Quentin
Pawno (2015) - Paige Turner

References 

Year of birth missing (living people)
Living people
Australian male television actors
Australian male stage actors
Helpmann Award winners

External links